The 2013 Eastern Illinois Panthers football team represented Eastern Illinois University as a member of the Ohio Valley Conference (OVC) during the 2013 NCAA Division I FCS football season. Led by Dino Babers in his second and final season as head coach, the Panthers compiled an overall record of 12–2 overall with a mark of 8–0 in conference play, winning the OVC title for the second consecutive season. Eastern Illinois earned the conference's automatic bid into the NCAA Division I Football Championship playoffs, where the Panthers defeated Tennessee State in the second round before losing to Towson in the quarterfinals. The team played home games at O'Brien Field in Charleston, Illinois.

On December 18, Babers resigned to become the head football coach at Bowling Green State University.

Schedule

Game summaries

San Diego State

Ranking movements

References

Eastern Illinois
Eastern Illinois Panthers football seasons
Ohio Valley Conference football champion seasons
Eastern Illinois
Eastern Illinois Panthers football